Justice Griffith may refer to:

Lynn B. Griffith, associate justice of the Ohio Supreme Court
Robert Frederick Griffith, associate justice of the New Hampshire Supreme Court
Samuel Griffith, chief justice of the High Court of Australia

See also
Thomas Griffitts, associate justice of the Supreme Court of Pennsylvania